Aker is a Scandinavian, English, and Turkish surname.  People with the name include:

 Brian Aker (born 1972), American open-source hacker
 Jack Aker (born 1940), American baseball player
 Mustafa Ertuğrul Aker (1892–1961), Turkish soldier
 Raymond Aker (1920–2003), British navigator and historian
 Şefik Aker (1877–1964), Turkish soldier
 Tim Aker (born 1985), British politician
 Jason Akermanis (born 1977), Australian football player, commonly known as "Aker"

See also
 Jon Åker (1927–2013), Norwegian hospital director
Turkish-language surnames

Surnames of Turkish origin